Waldbillig ( or (locally)  ) is a commune and small town in the canton of Echternach, Luxembourg.

, the town of Waldbillig, which lies in the centre of the commune, has a population of 566.  Other towns within the commune include Christnach with a population of 793 and Haller with a population of 413. Other localities include Mullerthal with 55 inhabitants and Freckeisen with a population of 50.

Population

References

External links
 

 
Communes in Echternach (canton)
Towns in Luxembourg